Château de Lussac (Lussac-Saint Emilion) is a 30-hectare vineyard located in the village of Lussac, Gironde, in the Lussac-Saint-Emilion Bordeaux's wine appellation. This appellation is one of the so-called satellite appellations of Saint-Émilion.

In the heart of the village, Château de Lussac is easily visible by its distinctive architecture. The main building was built in 1876 by Gascon Montouroy.  This vintner and vine grower transmitted the property to his son-in-law, Marquis de Sercey.  The property remained in this family until the 1980s when Olivier Roussel repurchased it and produced wines for about 15 years. 

In 2000, Griet and Hervé Laviale took over the property.  They are also the owners of Château Franc Mayne.  

The  of average 30 years old vines are planted on the limestone plateau, naturally well drained and exposed. There are 77% Merlot and 23% Cabernet Franc in the vineyards.

The wines 

First wine: Château de Lussac 

Second wine: Le Libertin de Lussac

References

External links 
Official website of Château de Lussac
an illustrated tour of the winery (in French)

Bordeaux wine producers
Châteaux in Gironde